SEMI Font, also known as SEMI OCR font, is used for marking silicon wafers in the semi-conductor industry.

The SEMI font character set include 26 uppercase letters, 10 numbers, dash and period.
Their shapes and dimensions are specified by SEMI M12/M13 standard, which was approved by Global Traceability Committee and North American Traceability Committee.

When used in “single-density” mode, laser scribers use a dot matrix of 5 dots horizontal and 9 dots vertical, in “double-density” mode, the matrix is 10 dots horizontal and 18 dots vertical.

References 
semi.org
barcodesoft.com
Semiconductor technology
Typefaces
OCR typefaces